Augochlorella neglectula is a species of sweat bee in the family Halictidae.

Subspecies
These two subspecies belong to the species Augochlorella neglectula:
 Augochlorella neglectula maritima
 Augochlorella neglectula neglectula

References

Further reading

 

Halictidae
Articles created by Qbugbot
Insects described in 1897